Cesar Ruiz may refer to:

César Ruiz (footballer) (born 1990), Peruvian footballer
César Ruiz (athlete) (born 1995), Cuban sprinter
César Ruiz Aquino, Filipino poet
Cesar Ruiz (American football) (born 1999), American football offensive linemen